John Muir High School is a four-year comprehensive secondary school in Pasadena, California, United States and is a part of the Pasadena Unified School District. The school is named after preservationist John Muir.

History
In 1926 the Pasadena Unified School District constructed a second high school in the northwest corner of the city. The school was named John Muir Technical High School and though majority white, it served a growing community of Black, Japanese-American and Mexican-American students. In 1938 the school was converted into a junior college and renamed Pasadena Junior College West. It closed during WW2 and was used by the US Army as a Training School.

Muir re-opened as John Muir Junior College in 1947. The school combined the last two years of high school with a full junior college curriculum. In the Fall semester of 1954, the school changed again to its present John Muir High School, a full four-year high school.

Prior to 1964, many White students from the community of La Cañada Flintridge, California joined those from the Black neighborhood of northwest Pasadena and the racially mixed community of Altadena, and enrollment was nearly 3,000 students.  In 1963, La Cañada Flintridge built its own high school and removed its students, except for those who would graduate in 1964. Shortly after that, the Pasadena City School District created Blair High School, siphoning off another large portion of the school's population.

In 2000 a teacher, Cyrus Javaheri, pleaded guilty to engaging in group sex with minors.  The teacher lured two students from the school in addition to another minor through the Internet.  Furthermore, numerous instances of cyber sex were conducted between the teacher and various minors as young as 12.

In 2002, caucasian teacher Scott Phelps was the center of controversy when he asserted that the majority of the students who are failing and disruptive were black.

Opinion was divisive with whites and blacks from the community on both sides. While some students and teachers defended that his assertion that the majority of the under performing students were black was accurate, others took offense to it. Subsequently, he was placed on administrative leave but allowed to return to the school a few days later. In 2005, Phelps was elected to a four-year term on Pasadena Unified School District Board of Trustees, where he remains as of 2018. In 2022, as the PUSD election season started, Phelps says that he “doesn’t want to seek re-election”

College and Career Pathways (Linked Learning)
Muir students participate in one of three "College and Career Pathways":  Arts, Entertainment and Media; Engineering and Environmental Science; Business and Entrepreneurship.  All three of these pathways have the distinction of being recognized as Linked Learning certified by ConnectEd. So far, only 37 schools and pathways in California have been recognized as Linked Learning certified.

In the Arts, Entertainment and Media Pathway, students are trained from 9th to 12th grade in music, drama, film and video production, graphic design, photography, painting, sculpting, and other fine arts. During their high school career, students fine-tune their creative energy, master self-expression and hone their critical thinking and problem-solving in classes like graphic design, animation, and film/video production. They also have the opportunity to turn their natural gifts and artistic passions into real-world skills through career insight opportunities at local art centers and design firms that provide valuable behind-the-scenes job shadowing and hands-on training and internships.

In the Engineering and Environmental Science Pathway students learn to use the power of science and mathematics to improve the quality of life on earth. This 9th through 12th grade Pathway is affiliated with the National Academy Foundation's Academy of Engineering that features the Project Lead the Way pre-engineering curriculum.

In the Business and Entrepreneurship program, this well-rounded curriculum includes business management, finance, accounting, marketing and entrepreneurship courses designed to strengthen leadership, problem-solving, organizational and management skills. Each course of study provides an in-depth analysis of business, financial and corporate trends and strategies in the marketplace. On campus clubs, student activities and group projects provide extensive, hands-on training in the business and financial system that governs our society.

Reinvention effort
For several years, Muir High School was under state monitoring.  In October 2007, the PUSD Board of education approved the reconstitution of John Muir High School for the 2008-2009 school year. The district worked with parents, staff, local businesses and other community members to develop a reconstitution plan, which later became known as Muir's "reinvention" plan.  The reform effort soon received support from ConnectEd, an organization partnering with the Irvine Foundation to implement Linked Learning in districts across California.
The focus was a reform plan which included the re-vamping of the academic structure to include College and Career Pathways (Linked Learning), professional development, extensive community support and requiring all teachers and staff to re-apply for their jobs.

John Muir High School's implementation of the Linked Learning reform effort was featured in an extensive two-year study by Stanford Center for Opportunity Policy in Education (SCOPE).
According to the SCOPE study, "by many accounts, in just 3 years, Muir High School has, in fact, very credibly demonstrated the success of the Linked Learning model.  The school has evolved from a traditional, comprehensive high school to a campus with three Linked Learning pathways that offer integrated curriculum, authentic learning experiences, and personalized support for students.  Early indications are that Muir, still with more than 90% of its students identifying as either African American or Latino, has made impressive gains during the initial years of implementation of Linked Learning.  Among the gains are a dramatic reduction in dropouts over the last two years (from a 34% drop out rate to a 9% dropout rate). In addition, Muir's Academic Performance Index has steadily risen since the 2007-2008 school year for the school as a whole as well as for significant subgroups.  This represents the fastest rate of increase of all the high schools in PUSD during that time period." According to the district website, as a result of the reinvention effort, John Muir High School has achieved a 57-point increase on its Academic Performance Index since 2007. In the 2012-2013 school year, the drop out rate decreased again to 7.8%.

Muir Ranch
From 2011 to 2018, a team of volunteer teachers and students began converting 1.5 acres of the John Muir High School campus into an urban farm. Muir Ranch grows a variety of flowers, vegetables and fruits. Students can complete community service or internship graduation requirements by enrolling in classes at the Ranch. Muir Ranch also provides paid internships to students, which are funded by private donations, special events, farmer's market sales, and subscriptions to the produce box program (CSA).

Documentary
In 2019 filmmaker and Muir Alumnus Pablo Miralles completed a film about John Muir High School called, Can We All Get Along? Stories of Integration from John Muir High School. The movie contains the stories of alumni, parents, teachers and administrators from over 80 years at the Northwest school, from its traditionally black, Mexican-American, Japanese-American, and white - base when "naturally" integrated, to busing and finally to its current "resegregation" into an almost entirely Latino and black campus.

Athletics
In football, the Mustangs have dominated the Pacific League the past two seasons (2013, 2014), combining to go 14-0 while winning back-to-back league crowns and appearances in the quarter and semifinals of the CIF Southern Section Southeast playoffs. During the 2021-22 school year, Muir also managed to go to the CIF-SS playoffs despite not playing the Turkey Tussle. Muir is tied with their crosstown rivals for first place for the playoffs. Pacific League Football Standing 2021-22 year

Muir student, Dejon Williams was named "2014 Offensive Player of the Year" by the Pasadena Star News. Williams was Pacific League MVP.  He recently signed with the New Mexico State University Aggies.

Tierra Adams is a top tier thrower in the state of California in the sport of track and field. She is a defending CIF champion in shot put, took 4th in the AAU Junior Olympic Games in North Carolina, 5th indoor state, and 7th in Arcadia Invitational. She recently signed with the Fresno State Bulldogs.

In 2012, Muir football cornerback Kevon Seymour was signed by the University of Southern California. He was ranked as the #15 cornerback in the United States by ESPN.

Turkey Tussle
The Annual Turkey Tussle Football Game tradition began in 1947 when the game was played between Pasadena Community College and John Muir Junior College. The two schools played until 1953. In 1954 the annual rivalry was played between what is now Pasadena High School and John Muir High School and is normally held at the Rose Bowl Stadium.  Muir has won the Turkey Tussle for the past 16 years.

Notable alumni

John Muir Technical High School (1926-38)
 Jackie Robinson (1936), first black major league baseball player
 Mack Robinson (1932), 1936 Olympic Silver Medalist

John Muir Junior College (1947-54)
 John Van de Kamp (1952), Attorney General of California (1982–1991).

John Muir High School (1954)
 Mary Akor, Nigerian-American long-distance runner
 Stacey Augmon, (1986), basketball player, NBA and Olympics
 John Beal (1964), film trailer music composer and former Vietnam War and Marine Corps military veteran.
 Richard Bell (1984), NFL player for the Pittsburgh Steelers
 Richard Bellis (1964), film and television music composer, former CLGA president, former ATAS governor, USC lecturer, musical director and former actor
 Alice Brown (1978) track and field Olympic gold medalist
 Chad Brown (1988), Pittsburgh Steelers, and Seattle Seahawks
 Tim Buchanan (1964), NFL player
 Dave Buchanan (1967), NFL, CFL, & WFL [World Football League]
 Julie Bunn, (1975), legislator, Minnesota House of Representatives (2007-current)
 Octavia Butler (1964), science fiction author (d. 2006)
 Steven Clarke (1966), biochemist and pioneer in aging research
Andre Coleman (1982) American author, screenwriter and award winning reporter
 Roger Dawson (1958), jazz and salsa musician, New York deejay
 Ricky Ervins (1987), USC Rose Bowl Game MVP 1990, NFL Washington Redskins Super Bowl XXVI leading rusher, San Francisco 49ers 1995
 Darrell Evans (1965), major league baseball player, 1969-89 
 Scott Garnett (1980), NFL defensive lineman
 Ryan Hollins (2002), NBA player and starting center for the Minnesota Timberwolves, Los Angeles Clippers
 Darick Holmes, (1989) NFL player for the Buffalo Bills, Green Bay Packers, Indianapolis Colts
 Michelle Huneven (1969), author
 Bobby Hutcherson (1958), jazz vibraphonist, composer and bandleader
 Rodney King, (1987), beaten by police after car chase, officers acquittals led to race riots in Los Angeles and vicinity
 Robert N. Lemen (1961), Minnesota state legislator
 Herbie Lewis (1958), jazz bassist and teacher
 Jackie Long (1998), actor
 Johnnie Lynn (1975), NFL player, New York Jets, NFL assistant coach, San Francisco 49ers, New York Giants, Philadelphia Eagles
 Saladin McCullough, gridiron football player, brother of Sultan McCullough
 Sultan McCullough (1998), NFL player
 Anthony Miller (1983), NFL wide receiver
 Inger Miller (1990), track and field Olympic gold medalist
 Obea Moore (1997). world record holder in 400 meter races for runners 17 and under at 45.14; one of the fastest US high school runners of all time.
 Dennis Muren (1964) multiple Academy Award winning visual effects artist 
 Renee Tajima-Peña (1976), documentary filmmaker.
 Danny Pittman (1976), NFL player
 Marcus Robertson (1987), Houston Oilers/ Tennessee Titans and Seattle Seahawks
 David Lee Roth (1972), lead singer of Van Halen 1974-85, 1996, 2007-current.
 Ruwanga Samath (2000), record producer and president of The Bird Call Productions
 Kevon Seymour (2012), NFL player - Buffalo Bills (2016–present)
 Rod Sherman (1962), professional football player
 Sirhan Sirhan (1963), perpetrator who assassinated Robert F. Kennedy
 Jeffrey C. Stewart (1967) Professor and Pulitzer Prize winning writer 
 Albert Stinson (1962), jazz bassist
 Joel Thomas (1985), 1992 Olympic gold medalist, swimming
 Jacque Vaughn, (1993) NBA head coach and player for the Orlando Magic
 LaShaun Ward (1998), NFL player
 DeWayne Walker (1978), CFL professional football player and American football coach
 Ken Whittingham (1977), American Television Director
 Linetta Wilson (1985), Olympic gold medalist, track and field

References

External links
 John Muir High School official website
 John Muir High School profile provided by the Pasadena Unified School District

Muir
Pasadena Unified School District
Schools in Pasadena, California
 
Educational institutions established in 1955
1955 establishments in California